The Synod of Rome (963) was a possibly uncanonical synod held in St. Peter's Basilica from 6 November until 4 December 963, under the authority of the Holy Roman Emperor, Otto I to depose Pope John XII. The events of the synod were recorded by Liutprand of Cremona.

Background
John XII was one of a long line of popes elected in the period called by Church historian, Cardinal Baronius, the Saeculum Obscurum ("the Dark Age") of the Papacy, when the Holy See was dominated by two courtesans of the family of the Counts of Tusculum, Theodora and Marozia. These two courtesans effectively ruled papal Rome and the Papal States and dominated papal elections ensuring that only their lovers, family and allies were elected pope.

Marozia, born Maria and also known as Mariuccia or Mariozza ( – 937), was a Roman noblewoman who was the alleged mistress of Pope Sergius III and was given the unprecedented titles senatrix ("senatoress") and patricia of Rome by Pope John X.

Edward Gibbon wrote that the "influence of two sister prostitutes, Marozia and Theodora, was founded on their wealth and beauty, their political and amorous intrigues: the most strenuous of their lovers were rewarded with the Roman tiara, and their reign may have suggested to darker ages the fable of a female pope. The bastard son, two grandsons, two great grandsons, and one great great grandson of Marozia — a rare genealogy — were seated in the Chair of St Peter." Pope John XII was her grandson. From this description, the term "pornocracy" has become associated with the effective rule in Rome of Theodora and Marozia, through their male surrogates.

Marozia was born about 890. She was the daughter of the Roman consul Theophylact, Count of Tusculum, and of Theodora, the real power in Rome, whom Liutprand of Cremona characterized as a "shameless whore... [who] exercised power on the Roman citizenry like a man."

Pope John XII, in imitation, also led a shameless and corrupt life, according to Liutprand of Cremona who records that he "turned the papal court into a brothel". According to Liutprand, Pope John XII was eventually murdered by his mistress's husband in flagranto delicto.

Pope John was repeatedly warned about his corrupt misuse of papal power and his misconduct of the Papacy by the Holy Roman Emperor, Otto I the Great, who threatened to bring his army to Rome from Frankfurt, then the imperial headquarters, and rectify the situation.

In the middle of 963, Pope John XII had been in communication with Emperor Otto regarding the emperor's concerns over John's pontificate, and the pope's meddling in the conflict between Otto and Berengar II, King of Italy. When Otto learned that John had allowed Berengar's son Adalbert into Rome, he marched on the city. After defending Rome and driving Otto back to the Tiber River, John fled the city and took refuge in Tibur. Otto then entered Rome on 2 November 963. After reminding the clergy and nobility that they were not canonically permitted to ordain, or even elect, a pope without the imperial consent, and compelling them to renew that oath, on 6 November 963 Otto convened a synod in St Peter's to deal with the irregularity of Pope John XII and his misconduct of the Papacy.

It was the special pre-rogative of the Roman Emperor to convoke, set the agenda of, and preside over, councils of the Church and the first eight Ecumenical Councils of the Church were so convoked and presided over by the Roman Emperor. Thus Otto's claim to call a Synod to deal with the crisis was entirely legal and canonical. The real issue, subsequently, for the theologians was not his right so to call a Synod but whether such a Synod could declare a pope self-deposed for crime alone or whether, as later Doctors of the Church have held, the self-deposition should arise from heresy. There is consensus among the Doctors that a pope may be declared self-deposed for heresy but whether he can be declared self-deposed solely for crime is an open question. The Synod of Rome of 963 declared Pope John XII self-deposed for crime.

Acts of the Synod
After convening the Synod, Otto appointed John, the Bishop of Narni and John, the Cardinal-Deacon to act as the pope's accusers, while Liutprand of Cremona, the emperor's secretary, responded to the Romans on behalf of the emperor. 

Firstly, Pope John XII was called forth to present himself before the council. As he was not present, Emperor Otto declared: “It appears to us just that the accusations should be set forth one by one; then what we should do can be decided on by common advice.” 

At this point John of Narni declared that he had seen Pope John XII ordain a deacon in a stable, and out of the appointed times. Another cardinal-priest bore witness that he had seen him celebrate Mass without communicating. Others accused him of murder and perjury, of sacrilege, of incest with members of his own family, including his sisters. They accused him of simony, of consecrating a ten-year-old child as Bishop of Todi, of converting the Lateran Palace into a brothel, of a life mostly spent hunting, of unjustly ordering men to be mutilated, of arson and of wearing armour and training for war and battle. Finally, they declared that he drank a toast to the Devil, and while playing at dice invoked the name of Jupiter, Venus and other pagan gods.

The Synod then drafted a letter to John XII, detailing the charges against him, and asking him to come to Rome to answer the accusations. The letter promised that nothing would be done that was contrary to canon law. John responded by threatening to excommunicate anyone involved in raising a new pope while he still lived. The Synod met again on 22 November and drafted a new letter to the pope, declaring that if he did not present himself to the Synod, he himself would be excommunicated. But the bearers of this letter could not locate John XII who had gone into hiding.

According to canon law, an accused bishop must be summoned three times; the Emperor satisfied himself with two citations. Therefore, on 4 December, the Synod met for the final time. In the absence of John XII (who was apparently hunting in the Catanian hills), the emperor recited the arraignment that the pope was a criminal and a traitor. He then turned to the Synod and announced, “Now let the holy Synod pronounce what it decides upon the matter.” The Synod responded by declaring “We therefore beg your Imperial Highness to drive away from the Holy Roman Church this monster, unredeemed from his vices by any virtue, and to allow another to be put in his place, who may merit by the example of a good conversation to preside over us.” Otto then proposed Leo the Protonotary as a possible successor to John XII, and, no other candidate being put forward, the Synod voted and elected him. The Synod was then closed by the Emperor.

Canonical status of the synod

The 963 Synod of Rome was, in all respects, conducted in accordance with canon law. Attempts to call it a "show trial" are without foundation and are based upon a false understanding of the imperial power which, from the very earliest days of the Church, since the days of the Emperor Theodosius, had the power, recognised by popes for centuries, to convoke and preside over Church councils. This, in turn, had been encapsulated into theological terms by the teaching of Pope Gelasius I on the "Two Swords" or Dyarchy, set out in his letter, Famuli vestrae pietatis, also known by the Latin mnemonic Duo sunt ("there are two"), written in 494 to Byzantine Emperor Anastasius I Dicorus. This set out, in general terms, the boundaries of power of the popes and emperors.

Still less can the Synod merely be dismissed as a political manoeuvre of the emperor, as secularist and Protestant historians are apt to do not only with imperial interventions but also with the acts of popes and bishops. Emperor Otto and the Synod of Rome in effect saved the Church and the Papacy from a corrupt pope and, indeed, a long line of corrupt popes. The successor pope, chosen by the Synod, Pope Leo VIII is recognised by the Church as a valid pope.

The validity of the Synod continues to be debated over the issue of papal self-deposition for crime. However, papal self-deposition for heresy is commonly recognised by the Doctors of the Church such as St Robert Bellarmine and St Alphonsus Liguori.

Some still ignorantly claim that a layman could not convene the Synod but only a bishop which, if true, would invalidate the first eight Ecumenical Councils of the Church among others, all of which were convened and presided over by the emperor, not the pope.

It is also claimed that Pope John XII was not accorded a defence, but that claim, too, fails since he was given three opportunities to attend the Synod and arrogantly refused even to recognise there was a problem, preferring to go hunting in the Catanian hills instead.

It is also suggested that the election of a layman to the Papacy was illegal but that, too, is unsustainable since it has been done more than once validly and the candidate was simply ordained prior to coronation. Leo was ordained to the Holy Orders of Porter, Lector, Acolyte, Subdeacon, Deacon and Priest by Sico, the cardinal-bishop of Ostia, who then proceeded to consecrate him as Bishop on 6 December 963. These ordinations were all canonical. He was then consecrated pope in proper form.

It is unsurprising that the acts of the Synod were condemned at a new synod held the following year, since, after Emperor Otto had left Rome to return to Frankfurt with his army, Pope John XII, with his remaining supporters, returned to Rome, overthrew Pope Leo VIII, excommunicated all involved in the Synod, ordering many of them to be mutilated, and Pope John XII held his own synod to declare the acts of the Synod invalid. However, since he was no longer the true and valid pope, his acts and new synod were therefore themselves invalid. Shortly thereafter Pope John XII died on 14 May 964, at the age of 27, seemingly in the manner described by Liutprand of Cremona.

Some, nevertheless, continue to argue that some of the acts of the Synod were invalid.

Composition of the synod
Present along with the Holy Roman Emperor were the following prelates:

Italy
The Deacon Rodalph, representing the Patriarch of Aquileia, the highest ecclesiastical authority in the west after the pope.
Walpert, Archbishop of Milan
Peter IV, Archbishop of Ravenna
Hubertus, Bishop of Parma
Liutprand, Bishop of Cremona
Sico, Bishop of Ostia
Teophylactus, Bishop of Praeneste
Benedictus, Bishop of Silva Portus
Giovanni, Bishop of Sabina
Leo I, Bishop of Velletri-Segni
The Bishop of Albano
The bishop of Silva Candida
The Bishop of Gabium
The Bishop of Forum Claudii
The Bishop of Bleda
The Bishop of Nepi
The Bishop of Caere
The Bishop of Tibur
The Bishop of Alatri
The Bishop of Anagni
The Bishop of Treviso
The Bishop of Ferentino
The Bishop of Norma
The Bishop of Veroli
The Bishop of Sutri
The Bishop of Narni
The Bishop of Gallese
The Bishop of Falerii
The Bishop of Orta
The Bishop of Terracina

Germany and West Francia
Adaldag, Archbishop of Hamburg-Bremen
Landward, Bishop of Minden
Otgar, Bishop of Speyer

Cardinal-priests
There were 13 cardinal priests who attended the synod, one of whom was the future Pope Benedict V. An unknown number had fled with Pope John XII. Their Titular churches were:
Santa Balbina
Basilica di Sant'Anastasia al Palatino
San Lorenzo in Damaso
San Crisogono
Santa Susanna
Saint Equitius
Saint Pammachius
Saint Calixtus
Santa Cecilia in Trastevere
San Lorenzo in Lucina
San Sisto Vecchio
Santi Quattro Coronati
Santa Sabina

Other participants
Present were all of the officers of the papal court, as well as deacons, Regionarii, notaries and the Primicerius of the Schola cantorum. Also present were a gathering of Roman nobles, who were aligned to the imperial party. These included:
Stephen, son of John the Superista
Demetrius, son of Meliosus
Crescentius of the Marble Horse
Giovanni de Mizina
Stephano de Imiza
Theodorus de Rufina
Giovanni de Primicerio
Leo de Cazunuli
Pietro de Cannapara
Benedict and his son Bulgamin

The Roman plebeians were represented by the heads of the Roman militia, led by Peter Imperiola. The emperor himself was also accompanied by a number of dukes and counts of Germany and Italy.

Notes

References
 Gregorovius, Ferdinand, The History of Rome in the Middle Ages, Vol. III (1895)
 Mann, Horace K., The Lives of the Popes in the Early Middle Ages, Vol. IV: The Popes in the Days of Feudal Anarchy, 891–999 (1910)

10th-century church councils
History of the papacy
Medieval Rome
963